Army Council may refer to:
 Army Council (1647), of the New Model Army
 Army Council (1904), of the British Army, renamed as the Army Board in 1967
 IRA Army Council, of the Provisional Irish Republican Army
 Ulster Army Council, set up in 1973 as an umbrella group by the Ulster Defence Association and the Ulster Volunteer Force to co-ordinate joint paramilitary operations.
 Continuity Army Council of the Continuity Irish Republican Army
 Army Council (RIRA) of the Real Irish Republican Army